Cannington is a village and civil parish  northwest of Bridgwater in the Sedgemoor district of Somerset, England. It lies on the west bank of the River Parret, and contains the hamlet of Edstock.

History

The parish formerly included part of the village of Combwich, with its port and ferry terminal. In 1881 the parish contained .

The Saxon name of this village was Caninganmaersees or Cantuctone. Cantuc was an Old English word for a ridge, ton a settlement.

The Battle of Cynwit took place in 878, and Cannington Camp, a Bronze Age and Iron Age hill fort, (also called Cynwir or Cynwit Castle) has been suggested as the most likely location for it.
The Cannington Camp site, of recognized archaeological importance, has been partly destroyed by Castle Hill Quarry in its limestone quarrying activities.

It was the site of a Benedictine nunnery, founded by Robert de Courcy about 1140, which survived until the dissolution of the monasteries. The nunnery owned significant land in the area. The site is now Cannington Court which incorporates some remains of the Priory.

The lords of the manor were the Clifford family including Hugh Clifford, 2nd Baron Clifford of Chudleigh. Gurney Manor, a 13th-century manor house with an attached chapel wing, had been converted into flats but is now supported by the Landmark Trust and is available as holiday accommodation. A manor house was also built at Blackmore Farm, with its own chapel, around 1480 for Thomas Tremayll.

Cannington was part of the hundred of Cannington.

The Cannington Centre for Land-based Studies was formerly known as Cannington College, which was established in 1921, but now forms part of Bridgwater College. The village is also home to Brymore Academy.

The dairy in Cannington, which has been operating since the 1930s, is now owned by local firm Yeo Valley Organic and produces yoghurt.

Religious sites

The Church of St Mary has a tower, 120 feet/36.6m tall, which dates from the 14th century, the remainder was rebuilt in the early 15th century and restored in 1840 by Richard Carver. It was previously connected to Cannington Court and is postulated as the former church of a house of Benedictine Nuns. It has been designated by English Heritage as a Grade I listed building.

Governance

The parish council has responsibility for local issues, including setting an annual precept (local rate) to cover the council's operating costs and producing annual accounts for public scrutiny. The parish council evaluates local planning applications and works with the local police, district council officers, and neighbourhood watch groups on matters of crime, security, and traffic. The parish council's role also includes initiating projects for the maintenance and repair of parish facilities, as well as consulting with the district council on the maintenance, repair, and improvement of highways, drainage, footpaths, public transport, and street cleaning. Conservation matters (including trees and listed buildings) and environmental issues are also the responsibility of the council.

The village falls within the non-metropolitan district of Sedgemoor, which was formed on 1 April 1974 under the Local Government Act 1972, having previously been part of Bridgwater Rural District, which is responsible for local planning and building control, local roads, council housing, environmental health, markets and fairs, refuse collection and recycling, cemeteries and crematoria, leisure services, parks, and tourism.

Somerset County Council is responsible for running the largest and most expensive local services such as education, social services, libraries, main roads, public transport, policing and fire services, trading standards, waste disposal and strategic planning.

The village is part of 'Cannington and Wembdon' electoral ward. Although Cannington is the most populous area the ward does include Wembdon. The total population of the ward at the 2011 census was 4,507. 
 
It is also part of the Bridgwater and West Somerset county constituency represented in the House of Commons of the Parliament of the United Kingdom. It elects one Member of Parliament (MP) by the first past the post system of election, and was part of the South West England constituency of the European Parliament prior to Britain leaving the European Union in January 2020, which elected seven MEPs using the d'Hondt method of party-list proportional representation.

References

External links

 Cannington Village website
 Cannington in Bloom Website
 

Villages in Sedgemoor
Somerset Levels
Civil parishes in Somerset